Catherine Bernard (24 August 1663, in Rouen – 6 September 1712, in Paris) was a French poet, novelist, and playwright. She was the first woman to compose a tragedy performed at the Comédie-Française.

References 

1663 births
1712 deaths
French poets
French novelists
French dramatists and playwrights